The Communauté d'agglomération de La Rochelle is the communauté d'agglomération, an intercommunal structure, centred on the city of La Rochelle. It is located in the Charente-Maritime department, in the Nouvelle-Aquitaine region, South West France. Its area is 327.0 km2. Its population was 171,811 in 2018, of which 76,114 in La Rochelle proper.

In January 2000, the Community of cities of La Rochelle turned into the Communauté d'agglomération de La Rochelle. It was expanded with 10 more communes in January 2014.

The Communauté d'agglomération de La Rochelle divides into two constituencies: Charente-Maritime's 1st constituency and Charente-Maritime's 2nd constituency. A mayor of La Rochelle from April 1999 to April 2014 and an MP of the Charente-Maritime's 1st constituency from April 1999 to June 2012, Maxime Bono was the president of the Communauté d'agglomération de La Rochelle from its creation to April 2014, when he was succeeded by Jean-François Fountaine.

Composition
The communauté d'agglomération consists of the following 28 communes:

Angoulins
Aytré
Bourgneuf
Châtelaillon-Plage
Clavette
Croix-Chapeau
Dompierre-sur-Mer
Esnandes
L'Houmeau
La Jarne
La Jarrie
Lagord
Marsilly
Montroy
Nieul-sur-Mer
Périgny
Puilboreau
La Rochelle
Saint-Christophe
Sainte-Soulle
Saint-Médard-d'Aunis
Saint-Rogatien
Saint-Vivien
Saint-Xandre
Salles-sur-Mer
Thairé
Vérines
Yves

The communes are located in the cantons of Aytré, Châtelaillon-Plage (partly), La Jarrie (partly), Lagord and La Rochelle-1, 2 and 3.

References

External links
 Agglomeration community of La Rochelle

Rochelle
Rochelle